Nweyon is a village in Singu Township, Pyinoolwin District, Mandalay Division, Myanmar. 

It is located about 2 km east of Letha Taung, also known as the Singu Plateau, near National Highway 31.

References 

Populated places in Mandalay Region